State road D.715 is a north to south state road in Turkey. The northern end of the  road merges to State road D.750 at a location popularly known as Kulu makası (Kulu junction) north of Lake Tuz. The southern end of the road merges to State road D.400 in Silifke. D-715 runs through the provinces of Konya, Karaman and Mersin.

Itinerary 

References and notes 

715
Transport in Konya Province
Transport in Karaman Province
Transport in Mersin Province